Uppampalem is a village in Rowthulapudi Mandal, Kakinada district in the state of Andhra Pradesh in India.

Geography 

Demographics 
 India census, Uppampalem had a population of 505, out of which 259 were male and 246 were female. The population of children below 6 years of age was 57. The literacy rate of the village was 51.12%.

References 

Villages in Rowthulapudi mandal